Jerard Ajemian, also spelled Jarad, was a Lebanese footballer who played as a forward.

Club career 
Ajemian played for Homenetmen in 1940, and Pagramian in 1946.

International career 
Ajemian took part in Lebanon's first international match, in a friendly against Mandatory Palestine in 1940. In May 1946 he also represented Beirut XI, Beirut's select team, in a friendly game against Egyptian club Alexandria.

References

External links
 

Year of birth missing
Year of death missing
Lebanese people of Armenian descent
Ethnic Armenian sportspeople
Association football forwards
Association football outside forwards
Lebanese footballers
Lebanese Premier League players
Homenetmen Beirut footballers
Pagramian SC footballers
Lebanon international footballers